R. Samy (died 10 May 2018) popularly known as Melur Sami was an Indian politician and  former member of the Tamil Nadu Legislative Assembly from the Melur constituency. As a cadre of All India Anna Dravida Munnetra Kazhagam party he represented the same Melur constituency in the 2001, 2006 and 2011 elections.He was one of the founding leaders of Amma Makkal Munnetra Kazhagam.

References 

All India Anna Dravida Munnetra Kazhagam politicians
Living people
Year of birth missing (living people)